Oxford Brookes University (formerly known as Oxford Polytechnic) is a public university in Oxford, England. It is a new university, having received university status through the Further and Higher Education Act 1992. The university was named after its first principal, John Henry Brookes, who played a major role in the development of the institution.

Oxford Brookes University is spread across four campuses, with three primary sites based in and around Oxford and the fourth campus located in Swindon. Oxford Brookes University planned to demolish its Wheatley campus and build houses on the site; the local council refused planning permission, but Oxford Brookes appealed, and won in 2020.  the Brookes Web site said that the institution had 16,900 students, 2,800 staff and over 190,000 alumni in over 177 countries. The university is divided into four faculties: Oxford Brookes Business School, Health and Life Sciences, Humanities and Social Sciences, and Technology, Design and Environment. Oxford Brookes University's partnership with the Association of Chartered Certified Accountants (ACCA) allows ACCA students to earn a BSc (Hons) in applied accounting with the submission of a research and analysis project work while taking their ACCA examinations. The university also has schools of architecture and law. Brookes is a member of the University Alliance mission group.

History
Oxford Brookes University started in 1865 as the Oxford School of Art, located in a single room on the ground floor of the Taylor Institution at St Giles', Oxford. In 1870 the School of Science was added and in 1891, under the administration of the City Council's Technical Instruction Committee, it was renamed the Oxford City Technical School, incorporating the School of Art, which remained distinct. Plans were made to relocate to the former Blue Coat School for Boys on St. Ebbes.

In 1934 the School of Art and the Technical School were merged and John Henry Brookes, head of the School of Art and vice-principal of the Technical School, was appointed the first principal of the merged institution. By 1950 the college had 4,000 students. A new campus was built on a site offered by the local Morrell brewing family. Renamed "Oxford College of Technology", it opened on the new site in 1956. Its first residence hall was established in 1960 and the college relocated to Headington in 1963.

In 1970, it became Oxford Polytechnic. In 1976, it took over the former Lady Spencer-Churchill College, which had been founded in Wheatley in August 1965. In 1992 it incorporated the Dorset House School of Occupational Therapy, the first school of occupational therapy in the UK. Later in 1992, following enactment of the Further and Higher Education Act, it became Oxford Brookes University, the only one of the new universities to be named after its founder. In 2000, it took over the site of Westminster College, Oxford, basing its education and theological activities on the site, although theology was withdrawn in 2015.

In October 2003, Oxford Brookes University became the first university in the world to be awarded Fairtrade status.

Baroness Kennedy served as the university's chancellor from 1994 to 2001. In 2007, Graham Upton retired as vice-chancellor and his successor, Janet Beer, was inaugurated in September. In July 2008, Shami Chakrabarti, director of Liberty, replaced Jon Snow as chancellor.

In March 2015, Alistair Fitt was inaugurated as vice-chancellor, replacing Janet Beer. In May 2022, Brookes Union released a letter stating the student body had filed a no confidence motion against Fitt Dame Katherine Grainger, a former British Olympic rower, replaced Shami Chakrabarti as chancellor. Grainger is Britain's most decorated female Olympic athlete and the first British woman to win medals at five successive games (Rio 2016, London 2012, Beijing in 2008, Athens in 2004 and Sydney in 2000). She was made a dame for her services to rowing and charity in the 2017 New Years Honours. In June 2020 Katherine Grainger stood down as chancellor. The position remains vacant. 

In 2015, Oxford Brookes University celebrated its 150th anniversary. A range of events and activities took place, including celebrations recognising John Henry Brookes, the university's modern founder. The first founder's day was held in May 2016.

Campuses
Oxford Brookes University has three main campuses and a fourth in Swindon.

Headington Campus
 

The Headington campus is in a residential area of Oxford. The campus is made up of three sites; the main site on Gipsy Lane, home to a number of departments from across the university's four academic faculties and the £132m John Henry Brookes Building which opened in 2014. Across the road is the Headington Hill Hall site, home to the School of Arts and School of Law, and a short walk from main site is the Marston Road site a dedicated space for the Faculty of Health and Life Sciences and home to subjects including nursing, midwifery and occupational therapy.

Located on the campus are the main halls of residence, including Crescent Hall, Cheney Student Village, Clive Booth Hall, Clive Booth non-en suite (formerly Morrell Hall) and Warneford Hall.

Wheatley Campus
The Wheatley campus is near Wheatley in the Oxfordshire countryside, seven miles south-east of the city centre. It is where information technology, mathematics and engineering are taught. The tall tower block can be seen from the A40 dual carriageway. The top four floors of the tower were initially closed in the early 2000s following the suicide of a student from the top. Five years later the rest of the tower was shut after asbestos was found and the building was deemed unsafe to house students. The campus is set for closure in the future, when the subjects taught at Wheatley are due to be moved to the Headington campus.

Harcourt Hill campus
The Harcourt Hill campus is situated on Harcourt Hill on Oxford's western perimeter, two and a half miles from the city centre. Education, philosophy, religion, theology, media and communication, and other subjects are taught here. It has two halls of residence: Harcourt Hill Hall and Westminster Hall. A regular devoted bus service links the campus to other campuses at Headington and Wheatley. It is also home to the university's leisure centre.

The campus was formerly the site of Westminster College, Oxford, an independent Methodist higher education institution which specialised in teacher training and theology. The campus was leased to Brookes by the Methodist Church, and Westminster College became the Westminster Institute of Education of Oxford Brookes University, located at the Harcourt Hill campus.

Swindon campus

Oxford Brookes University opened its Swindon campus in August 2016. The university moved from the former Ferndale campus in Swindon to a new and larger campus situated to the west of the town centre at the Delta Business Park. The building is named the Joel Joffe Building after Lord Joel Joffe, long-time Swindon resident and former human-rights lawyer. Adult nursing, operating department practice (ODP) and a range of continuing professional development (CPD) courses are taught there. The campus features a 185-seat lecture theatre, library and social learning spaces, teaching rooms and three clinical skills suites. Oxford Brookes University partners with Swindon College as part of its Associate College Partnership to deliver foundation and degree courses, provides widening participation activity with local schools.

Redevelopment
In recent years the university has seen major redevelopments including the opening of the £132 million John Henry Brookes Building, named after the university's spiritual leader, which opened on the Headington campus in 2014. It brings together the library and teaching spaces with student support services and the Students' Union (Brookes Union), who were formerly housed in the Helena Kennedy Centre on the Headington Hill site. The building has won multiple awards including a Royal Institute of British Architects (RIBA) National Award; three RIBA regional awards; Oxford Preservation Trust Award and the Student Experience category of the 2014 Education Estates Awards.

In 2013 the redeveloped Abercrombie Building opened on the Headington campus, offering facilities for architecture students with design studios and collaborative learning spaces. In October 2014 it won the Architects' Journal Retrofit Award.

In January 2015 Oxford Brookes University announced a major estates investment for the next 10 years, with £13 million per year to be spent on redevelopment across all its campuses. This is to include additional building on the Headington and Harcourt campuses as well as a new campus in Swindon. Part of this investment will see all activity moved from the Wheatley campus by 2021/22. The Oxford Brookes Business School moved from the Wheatley campus to refurbished buildings at Headington campus in 2017 with other departments to move to new buildings on the Headington Hill site in 2020. Many of the planned transfers to Headington campus have been postponed due to Covid-19 and issues with budgets. The proposed new location for the School of Arts alongside Engineering remains vacant at this time

The university's original redevelopment proposals were vigorously opposed by local residents in 2009 when presented to the local planning committee, with many undesirable aspects of the large student population in Oxford being discussed. However, the plans for the new building were eventually approved and building work began in 2010.

Organisation and governance

Faculties
Oxford Brookes University has four faculties which sit across its four campuses.

 Oxford Brookes Business School
Business School
Oxford School of Hospitality Management

Faculty of Health and Life Sciences
Department of Biological and Medical Sciences
Department of Midwifery, Community and Public Health
Department of Nursing
Department of Psychology, Health and Professional Development
Department of Sport, Health Sciences and Social Work (including the Functional Food Centre)

Faculty of Humanities and Social Sciences
School of Education
School of English and Modern Languages
School of History, Philosophy and Culture
Oxford Centre for Methodism and Church History
School of Law
Institute of Public Care
Department of Social Sciences (including Primate Conservation)

Faculty of Technology, Design and Environment
School of Architecture
School of Arts
School of the Built Environment
Department of Computing and Communication Technologies
Department of Mechanical Engineering and Mathematical Sciences

Chancellors
 Baroness Kennedy (1994–2001)
 Jon Snow (2001–2008)
 Shami Chakrabarti (2008–2015)
 Dame Katherine Grainger (2015–2020)
 Paterson Joseph (2022–Present)

Vice-chancellors
 Clive Booth (1992–1997)
 Graham Upton (1997–2007)
 Janet Beer (2007–2015)
 Alistair Fitt (2015–present)

Academic profile

Reputation and rankings 

Oxford Brookes University was ranked among the world's top institutions in 16 subjects and four subject areas in the QS World University Rankings by Subject 2017. In 2016, Brookes was listed as one of the world's top universities for its international outlook in the Times Higher Education's (THE) Top 200 international universities. Brookes has retained its top ten world ranking in the QS Distance Online MBA Ranking 2017 for its MBA programme. The university has 10 National Teaching Fellowships from the Higher Education Authority and was among the top 25 in the UK for teaching quality in the Times/Sunday Times Good University Guide 2016. Brookes is ranked in the top 51-100 for Architecture and Business & Management Studies in the world by QS World University Rankings by Subject 2019. It is also ranked in the top 10 for Hospitality & Leisure Management in the world by QS World University Rankings by Subject 2019. In both 2018 and 2019, QS World University Rankings named it the only UK university on its list of Top 50 universities under 50 years old in the world. It is among the top 400 universities in the world, ranked 363rd by the QS World University Rankings 2020.

In 2011, Oxford Brookes University was the sixth largest employer in Oxfordshire.

Hotcourses UK ranked Oxford Brookes University in the top 15 of the most culturally diverse institutions in the UK in July 2016.

In July 2016, Headington and Harcourt Hill campuses received a Green Flag Award for the quality of their green spaces for the fifth year in a row.

In 2016, Oxford Brookes University achieved an overall satisfaction rate of 87% in the National Student Survey (NSS) higher than the national average of 86%. The university also had 18 subject areas which received 90% or higher overall satisfaction.

Separate schools 
Oxford Brookes University's School of Architecture is one of the largest in Britain and is consistently ranked in the top five schools in the UK and in the top 50 in the world,. Brookes' School of Law is the 16th placed law school in the latest Guardian Good University Guide The law school is also ranked 28th out of 100 UK university law schools for the study of undergraduate law in The Times and Sunday Times Good University Guide 2020. Moreover, law courses also are ranked in the top 150-200 bracket of the QS World University Subject Rankings. The university has been successful in national and international mooting competitions, in 2016 winning both the ESU Essex Court National Competition and the Inner Temple Inter-Varsity Mooting Competition, meaning the national Magna Carta moot - to celebrate the 800th anniversary of the signing of Magna Carta - as a consequence will be between two Oxford Brookes University teams.

Research standing 
In the most recent Research Excellence Framework in 2014 (REF 2014) 94% of research was internationally recognised and 59% judged to be of 'world leading' quality or 'internationally excellent'. This led to a 41% increase in quality-related research funding compared to a 3% rise across the sector.

In October 2016 the university retained its HR Excellence in Research Award from the European Commission, recognising the university's commitment to supporting the personal, professional and career development of its research-active staff.

Specialist study
The Centre for Development and Emergency Practice (CENDEP) in the School of the Built Environment was awarded the Queen's Anniversary Prize. CENDEP provides an academic setting for the study of cities, humanitarianism and refugees. Singer and activist Annie Lennox is patron of the Master's Course in Humanitarian and Development Practice.

In 2008, the MSc in Primate Conservation was also awarded the Queen's Anniversary Prize.

The Oxford Brookes Centre for Nutrition and Health is the UK's first research centre dedicated to functional foods. The centre was originally the Nutrition and Food Research Group at Oxford Brookes and was founded in 2004.

Computer science

The Department of Computing and Communication Technologies is internationally recognised for its research especially in the area of robotics, web technology, networking and software engineering. The department has a strong international student population in both its undergraduate and postgraduate programmes.

Automotive and motorsport engineering

The Oxford Brookes School of Technology is known for its automotive and motorsports technology/engineering courses leading to undergraduate BSc (Hons), BEng (Hons), MEng (Hons) and MSc degrees. Due to the close links between the school and several Formula 1 teams around Oxfordshire, the syllabus development for the undergraduate and post graduate courses are carried out in collaboration with F1 teams. Over the decade, the school has developed a niche for producing Formula 1 design and race engineers, who go on to build championship winning cars, participating in the FIA Formula 1 Championships. The school is also home and lead institution to Motorsport Knowledge Exchange which is a Government-funded small cooperative of institutions, involved in delivering motorsport education at a variety of levels from technician to post-graduate.

In 2007, Formula One world champion Fernando Alonso sponsored 12 Spanish postgraduate students to study for an MSc in motorsport engineering or in race engine design within the Department of Mechanical Engineering and Mathematical Sciences at the university. The university has a teaching staff that includes Geoff Goddard, a former chief designer at Cosworth.

The School of Technology at Oxford Brookes University is one of the three core universities in Faraday Advance, a partnership in advanced materials for transportation that develops future materials and technology for low-pollution, high-efficiency, cost-effective transport.

Partnerships
Oxford Brookes University's partnership with the Association of Chartered Certified Accountants (ACCA) allows ACCA students to earn a BSc (Hons) in Applied Accounting with the submission of a research and analysis project work while taking their ACCA examinations.

The university has a partnership with the International Business School (Nemzetközi Üzleti Főiskola) based in Budapest (Hungary). IBS students can attend courses which, besides the Hungarian degree, also provide OBU BA degrees in different subjects, such as marketing and communications.

The university has affiliations with Nilai University College in Malaysia. Affiliated subjects are computing, accounting and finance, business management, marketing management and hospitality management. All the subjects mentioned above are 3+0 programs.

Student life

Student union

Oxford Brookes Students' Union is the students' union of the university. It is a member-led organisation and all students are automatically members. The union offers a range of services for students; it hosts a number of student societies, a safety bus service, an advice service, and a system of student representatives. In 2012, Oxford Brookes students' union was ranked amongst the worst in the country for student satisfaction, according to the National Student Survey (NSS), where only 34% of students claimed to be content with the students' union.

Accommodation

There are currently 12 student halls four of which are on Headington campus, two on the Harcourt Hill campus, one on the Wheatley campus and three more halls around Headington. In addition, there are five privately operated halls of residence which are managed in partnership with the university by housing associations: Slade Park Student Apartments, Parade Green, Sinnet Court Student Apartments, Beech House Student Accommodation and Dorset House Student Apartments.

 Cheney Student Village
 Clive Booth Student Village
 Crescent Hall
 Westminster Hall
 Lady Spencer Churchill Hall
 Paul Kent Hall
 Slade Park
 Dorset House
 Beech House
 Parade Green
 Sinnet Court

Transport 

BrookesBus is a public bus service operated under contract by the Oxford Bus Company which operates between all Brookes campuses and student halls in Oxford. In 2014, Oxford Bus introduced a fleet of 20 new buses with flywheel energy storage on the BrookesBus service.

Notable alumni

See also
 Armorial of UK universities
 List of universities in the UK
 Post-1992 universities

References

External links
 Official website
 Oxford Brookes Students' Union
 

 
Educational institutions established in 1992
1992 establishments in England
University Alliance
Universities established in the 1990s
Universities UK